The surname Epstein is one of the oldest Ashkenazi Jewish family names. It is probably derived from the German town of Eppstein, in Hesse; the place-name was probably derived from Gaulish apa ("water", in the sense of a river) and German -stein ("stone", in the sense of a hill).

Some people with this name include:

Arts
 Alex Epstein, Israeli writer
 Barbara Epstein, literary editor
 Brian Epstein (1934–1967), businessman, manager of the Beatles
 Daniel Epstein (pianist)
 Daniel Mark Epstein, biographer and poet
 Deborah Epstein, French-American singer-songwriter more commonly known as SoShy
 Dena Epstein (1916–2013), American music librarian, writer, and musicologist
 Edward Jay Epstein, author and early critic of the Warren Commission
 Howie Epstein, bass guitarist
 Jacob Epstein, sculptor
 Jacob Epstein (art collector) (1864–1945), Lithuanian-American merchant, philanthropist, and art collector
 Jake Epstein, Canadian actor
 Jason Epstein, publisher who popularized the trade paperback
 Jean Epstein, film director
 Joseph Epstein, American editor and essayist
 Julius Epstein, Croatian pianist
 Julius J. Epstein, Oscar-winning screenwriter, brother of Philip G. Epstein
 Kathie Lee Epstein (born 1953), maiden name of Kathie Lee Gifford, American television host
 Lawrence J. Epstein (born 1946), American author 
 Leslie Epstein, novelist
 Mel Epstein, film director and producer
 Michael J. Epstein (born 1976), American filmmaker and musician 
 Mikhail Epstein, literary theorist and Emory University professor
 Philip G. Epstein, Oscar-winning screenwriter, brother to Julius J. Epstein
 Rob Epstein, American director 
 Selma Epstein, American concert pianist 
 Steven Epstein (music producer), U.S. classical music producer with Sony 
 Temi Epstein, child actress

Mathematics
 Bernard Epstein, American mathematician and physicist
 David B. A. Epstein, British mathematician
 Lenore A. Epstein, American statistician
 Paul Epstein, German mathematician
 Paul Sophus Epstein, American mathematician/physicist of Polish/Russian origin and California Institute of Technology professor. 
 Richard Arnold Epstein, mathematician, game theorist

Military
 Giora Epstein, "ace of aces" Israeli fighter pilot
 Joseph Epstein, communist French resistance leader

Religion
 Abraham Epstein (born 1841), Russo-Austrian rabbinical scholar
 Aryeh Leib Epstein, Polish rabbi 
 Baruch Epstein, Lithuanian rabbi and the son of Yechiel Michel Epstein
 Greg Epstein, Humanist Chaplain at Harvard University from 2005
 Isidore Epstein, rabbi and biblical scholar
 Mendel Epstein, American rabbi and kidnapper, also known as "The Prodfather"
 Moshe Mordechai Epstein, rabbi and author of the Levush Mordechai
 Yechiel Michel Epstein, Lithuanian rabbi and author of the Arukh HaShulkhan
 Zelik Epstein, Rosh Yeshiva of the Shaar HaTorah-Grodno Yeshiva, located in Kew Gardens, New York

Science and medicine
 Alex Epstein, American energy theorist
 Charles Epstein (geneticist)
 Claire Epstein (1911–2000), Israeli archaeologist
 Edward Epstein (meteorologist), developer of statistical weather forecasting
 Fred Epstein, pediatric neurosurgeon
 Lenore Epstein (born 1942), birth name of Lenore Blum, computer scientist and mathematician
 Mark Epstein, psychotherapist
 Sir Michael A. Epstein, British pathologist, discoverer of the Epstein-Barr virus.
 Robert Epstein, psychologist
 Rose Frisch (Rose Epstein Frisch), biologist
 Samuel Epstein, doctor and professor of environmental medicine
 Samuel Epstein (geochemist), Wollaston Medal winner

Sport
 Charlotte Epstein (1884–1938), nicknamed "Eppie", American Hall of Fame swimming coach, "Mother of Women's Swimming in America"
 Denis Epstein, German football player
 Hayden Epstein (born 1980), American NFL football player
 Kurt Epstein, Czechoslovakian Olympic water polo player
 Mike Epstein, nicknamed "SuperJew" (born 1943), American major league baseball player
 Theo Epstein (born 1973), American President of Baseball Operations for the Chicago Cubs

Other
 Alan H. Epstein, aeronautical engineer
 Anthony C. Epstein, American jurist
 David Epstein (gangster), former member of Epstein–Wolmark gang
 David G. Epstein, law professor
 Eliahu Epstein (1903–1990), birth name of Eliahu Eilat, Israeli diplomat and President of the Hebrew University of Jerusalem
 Howard Epstein, Canadian politician
 Hedy Epstein (1924–2016), Jewish anti-Zionist
 Israel Epstein, Polish-Chinese journalist
 Jacob Epstein (spy), alleged Soviet intelligence agent
 Jeffrey Epstein (1953–2019), American financier and sex offender
 Kathleen Epstein, American-British sculptor
 Lee Epstein, American political scientist 
 Leon Epstein (1919–2006), American political scientist 
 Leopold Vail Epstein (1910–1991), American attorney and father of Linda McCartney
 Melech Epstein (1889–1979), American journalist and historian 
 Moses J. Epstein ( 1911–1960), New York assemblyman
 Richard Epstein, law professor
 Samuel Epstein (politician), American politician, lawyer, and physician
 Simon Epstein, Israeli economist and historian
 Steven Epstein (academic), sociologist
 William Epstein, Canadian international civil servant

Fictional characters
 Juan Epstein, fictional character on the TV series Welcome Back, Kotter
 Dov Epstein, fictional character on the TV series Rookie Blue
 Solomon Epstein, fictional character on the TV series The Expanse

Variant surnames 
 Katja Ebstein (b. 1945), German singer
 Wilhelm Ebstein (1836–1912), German Jewish physician and nutritionist
 David Eppstein (b. 1963), computer scientist
 Margaret J. Eppstein, complex systems theorist
 Nikolay Epshtein (1918–2005), Soviet ice hockey coach
 Shakne Epshtein, Soviet journalist
Boris Epshteyn, political commentator

See also 
 Eppstein, town in Hesse, Germany
 Lords of Eppstein, family of Germany nobility
 "Le château d'Eppstein", story by Alexandre Dumas
 Ebstein's anomaly
 Epstein–Barr virus
 Palais Epstein in Vienna
 The Epstein School, a private Jewish-day school in Atlanta
 Epstein Hebrew Academy, a private Jewish day-school in St. Louis

References 

Ashkenazi surnames
German-language surnames
Yiddish-language surnames